Caleb Tyndale Okauchi Otto (May 19, 1943, in Peleliu – October 28, 2018) was a Palauan physician who served as a member of the senate of Palau.  He received a Bachelor of Science degree at the University of Washington in 1970.  He worked in health services in Fiji. From 3 September 2013, he served as the Permanent Representative of Palau to the United Nations.

References

1943 births
Living people
Members of the Senate of Palau
People from Peleliu
University of Washington alumni
Permanent Representatives of Nauru to the United Nations